Ralph Erskine Wayne (born 1932) is an American former politician.

Throughout his tenure on the Texas House of Representatives, Wayne lived in Plainview, Texas. Wayne was sworn into office for the first of his four consecutive terms in November 1964, as a Democratic legislator from District 89. Wayne then served his second term representing District 79, and subsequently won reelection twice thereafter for District 78.

References

People from Plainview, Texas
1932 births
Living people
20th-century American politicians
Democratic Party members of the Texas House of Representatives